Sandover may refer to:

People
Alfred Sandover (1866–1958), a British-Australian hardware merchant and philanthropist
Raymond Sandover (1910–1995), a soldier in Australian and British Armies
William Sandover (1822–1909), South Australian politician and hotelier

Places
Sandover, Northern Territory, a locality in Australia
Sandover Highway, a  road in Australia
Sandover River, a river in  Australia

Other uses
Sandover Medal, Australian rules football award
 Sandover Village, starting point in the Jak and Daxter video game universe; site of Samos the Sage

See also
The Changing Light at Sandover, 560-page epic poem by James Merrill (1926–1995)
Standover (disambiguation)